In geometry, the midpoint-stretching polygon of a cyclic polygon  is another cyclic polygon inscribed in the same circle, the polygon whose vertices are the midpoints of the circular arcs between the vertices of .

Musical application

Convergence to regularity
The midpoint-stretching polygon of a regular polygon is itself regular, and iterating the midpoint-stretching operation on an arbitrary initial polygon results in a sequence of polygons whose shape converges to that of a regular polygon.

References

Polygons